Harry Towle Watson (March 28, 1882 – January 29, 1957) was an American college football, basketball and baseball player and coach. He served as the head football coach at Hamilton College in 1905, Ursinus College in 1907, and the University of Rochester from 1912 to 1915. Watson was born on March 28, 1882, in Exeter, New Hampshire.  He died on January 29, 1957, at his home in Jamestown, New York.

Head coaching record

Football

References

External links
 

1882 births
1957 deaths
Hamilton Continentals baseball coaches
Hamilton Continentals men's basketball coaches
Hamilton Continentals football coaches
Rochester Yellowjackets football coaches
Ursinus Bears baseball coaches
Ursinus Bears football coaches
Williams Ephs football coaches
Williams Ephs football players
People from Exeter, New Hampshire
Sportspeople from Rockingham County, New Hampshire